Tol Polui (also Romanized as Tol Polū’ī; also known as Taleh Palā’ī and Tom Polū’ī) is a village in Darz and Sayeban Rural District, in the Central District of Larestan County, Fars Province, Iran. At the 2006 census, its population was 16, in 5 families.

References 

Populated places in Larestan County